In mathematics and game theory, Bulgarian solitaire is a card game that was introduced by Martin Gardner.

In the game, a pack of  cards is divided into several piles. Then for each pile, remove one card; collect the removed cards together to form a new pile (piles of zero size are ignored).

This state is reached in  moves or fewer. If  is not triangular, no stable configuration exists and a limit cycle is reached.

Random Bulgarian solitaire
In random Bulgarian solitaire or stochastic Bulgarian solitaire a pack of  cards is divided into several piles.  Then for each pile, either leave it intact or, with a fixed probability , remove one card; collect the removed cards together to form a new pile (piles of zero size are ignored). This is a finite irreducible Markov chain.

In 2004, Brazilian probabilist of Russian origin Serguei Popov showed that stochastic Bulgarian solitaire spends "most" of its time in a "roughly" triangular distribution.

References

 

20th-century card games
Recreational mathematics
Combinatorial game theory
Year of introduction missing